Miyan ki Todi, often simply referred to as Todi or Darbari Todi, is a Hindustani classical raga which gave its name to the Todi thaat, one of the ten types of classical music according to the musicologist Bhatkhande. Ragas from the Todi raganga (class of ragas) include Todi (a.k.a. Miyan ki Todi) itself, Bilaskhani Todi, Gujari Todi (also called Gurjari Todi), Desi Todi, Hussaini Todi, Asavari Todi (more commonly known as Komal Rishabh Asavari), and Bahaduri Todi.

The equivalent raga in Carnatic music is Shubhapantuvarali. But in Todi, the pancham is omitted in the Arohana, whereas Shubhapanthuvarali uses the panchamam in both the arohana and avarohana. The Carnatic Melakarta Hanumatodi is the equivalent of Bhairavi thaat, but the Hindustani Bhairavi raga is the equivalent of Carnatic Sindhu Bhairavi. Carnatic Todi does not have any similarity with Hindustani Todi (Miyan ki Todi) raga. Though the Swarasthana orders of Carnatic Thodi are similar to Hindustani Bhairavi thaat, but when the Carnatic Todi is sung it has no similarity with Hindustani Todi, Bhairavi, or Carnatic Sindhu Bhairavi.

Aroha & Avaroha
Arohana

Avarohana

Vadi and Samavadi
Komal Dha and Komal Ga. 
Re, ga and dha are intoned slightly low, and  ma is very sharp.

Pakad or Chalan
The distinctive phrase is r/g-\r\S, where r may be subtly oscillated.

Pa is omitted in ascent, but present and often sustained. 
Kaufmann mentions that some musicians would call Todi with Pa Miyan Ki Todi, but others would see no difference between Todi and Miyan Ki Todi.

Sometimes the ascent is performed without Sa, starting from Ni.

Organization and relationships
Miyan Ki Todi is similar to Gujari Todi and many movements are common, but in Gujari Todi Pa is omitted and there is more emphasis on Re and Dha.

Like Miyan Ki Malhar Miyan Ki Todi is said to be composed by Tansen, but this seems unlikely as the Todi scale in Tansen's time was the scale of today's Bhairavi and the name Miyan Ki Todi appears first in the 19th century literature.

Samay (time)

Todi should be performed in the morning, approximately 8-10AM. In overnight concerts, Todi is performed as early as 4AM.

Raga

Todi is nearly always shown as a gentle, beautiful woman, holding a veena and standing in a lovely green forest, surrounded by deer. Kaufman cites the Sangita-Darpana "With a fair erect body like the white lotus, and delicate like the gleaming dew drop, Todi holds the vina and provides fun and frolic to the deer deep in the forest. Her body is anointed with saffron and camphor".

Rasa in Indian classical music is understood as mood of the raga. Miyan Ki Todi is mostly pervaded by a pensive, mournful mood which is then relieved in the drut (faster tempo) part, by a festive piece, possibly to alleviate the heavy pathos in the earlier stages of rendering, though not always. The composition is such as to afford an artist of high calibre to mould it in either the inherent pensive mood or to entirely present a festive mood.

References

Literature

External links
 SRA on Samay and Ragas
 SRA on Ragas and Thaats
 Rajan Parrikar on Ragas
 More details about raga Miyaki Todi

Hindustani ragas
Ragas in the Guru Granth Sahib